The pons (from Latin , "bridge") is part of the brainstem that in humans and other bipeds lies inferior to the midbrain, superior to the medulla oblongata and anterior to the cerebellum.

The pons is also called the pons Varolii ("bridge of Varolius"), after the Italian anatomist and surgeon Costanzo Varolio (1543–75). This region of the brainstem includes neural pathways and tracts that conduct signals from the brain down to the cerebellum and medulla, and tracts that carry the sensory signals up into the thalamus.

Structure
The pons is in the brainstem situated between the midbrain and the medulla oblongata, and in front of the cerebellum. A separating groove between the pons and the medulla is the inferior pontine sulcus. The superior pontine sulcus separates the pons from the midbrain. The pons can be broadly divided into two parts: the basilar part of the pons (ventral pons), and the pontine tegmentum (dorsal pons). Running down the midline of the ventral surface is the basilar sulcus, a groove for the basilar artery. Most of the pons is supplied by the pontine arteries, which arise from the basilar artery. A smaller portion of the pons is supplied by the anterior and posterior inferior cerebellar arteries.

Most of it appears as a broad anterior bulge above the medulla. Posteriorly, it consists mainly of two pairs of thick stalks called cerebellar peduncles. They connect the cerebellum to the pons (middle cerebellar peduncle) and midbrain (superior cerebellar peduncle).

Development
During embryonic development, the metencephalon develops from the rhombencephalon and gives rise to two structures: the pons and the cerebellum. The alar plate produces sensory neuroblasts, which will give rise to the solitary nucleus and its special visceral afferent (SVA) column; the cochlear and vestibular nuclei, which form the special somatic afferent (SSA) fibers of the vestibulocochlear nerve,  the spinal and principal trigeminal nerve nuclei, which form the general somatic afferent column (GSA) of the trigeminal nerve, and the pontine nuclei which relays to the cerebellum.

Basal plate neuroblasts give rise to the abducens nucleus, which forms the general somatic efferent fibers (GSE); the facial and motor trigeminal nuclei, which form the special visceral efferent (SVE) column, and the superior salivatory nucleus, which forms the general visceral efferent fibers (GVE) of the facial nerve.

Nuclei

A number of cranial nerve nuclei are present in the pons:
 mid-pons: the 'chief' or 'pontine' nucleus of the trigeminal nerve sensory nucleus (V)
 mid-pons: the motor nucleus for the trigeminal nerve (V)
 lower down in the pons: abducens nucleus (VI)
 lower down in the pons: facial nerve nucleus (VII)
 lower down in the pons: vestibulocochlear nuclei (vestibular nuclei and cochlear nuclei) (VIII)

Function
Functions of these four cranial nerves (V-VIII) include regulation of respiration, control of involuntary actions, sensory roles in hearing, equilibrium, and taste, and in facial sensations such as touch and pain, as well as motor roles in eye movement, facial expressions, chewing, swallowing, and the secretion of saliva and tears.

The pons contains nuclei that relay signals from the forebrain to the cerebellum, along with nuclei that deal primarily with sleep, respiration, swallowing, bladder control, hearing, equilibrium, taste, eye movement, facial expressions, facial sensation, and posture.

Within the pons is the pneumotaxic center consisting of the subparabrachial and the medial parabrachial nuclei. This center regulates the change from inhalation to exhalation.

The pons is implicated in sleep paralysis, and may also play a role in generating dreams.

Clinical significance
 Central pontine myelinolysis is a demyelinating disease that causes difficulty with sense of balance, walking, sense of touch, swallowing and speaking. In a clinical setting, it is often associated with transplant or rapid correction of blood sodium. Undiagnosed, it can lead to death or locked-in syndrome.

Other animals

Evolution
The pons first evolved as an offshoot of the medullary reticular formation. Since lampreys possess a pons, it has been argued that it must have evolved as a region distinct from the medulla by the time the first agnathans appeared, 525 million years ago.

Additional images

References

External links

 Diagram at UCC